This is a list of all cricketers who have played first-class, list A or Twenty20 cricket for Auckland cricket team. Seasons given are first and last seasons; the player did not necessarily play in all the intervening seasons.

A
 John Ackland, 1980/81-1983/84
 Andre Adams, 1997/98-2012/13
 James Adams, 2010/11-2011/12
 Stephen Adams, 1982/83-1984/85
 John Aiken, 1999/2000-2000/01
 R. A. Aitken, 1980/81
 Cyril Allcott, 1921/22-1931/32
 Samuel Alpe, 1862/63-1873/74
 Leslie Andersen, 1960/61
 James Anderson, 2007/08
 Frederick Andrews, 1935/36-1940/41
 Gene Andrews, 2005/06
 John Ansenne, 1893/94
 Arnold Anthony, 1909/10-1930/31
 Robert Arblaster, 1976/77-1979/80
 John Arneil, 1880/81-1893/94
 Dean Askew, 1997/98
 Azhar Abbas, 2007/08-2008/09
 Azhar Mahmood, 2011/12-2012/13

B
 Rex Baddeley, 1969/70-1971/72
 Sydney Badeley, 1929/30
 Thomas Ball, 1894/95-1896/97
 Frederick Barclay, 1902/03-1903/04
 Aaron Barnes, 1993/94-2004/05
 Brian Barrett, 1985/86
 Michael Barry, 2012/13-2015/16
 Dean Bartlett, 2009/10-2014/15
 Hamish Barton, 1995/96-1997/98
 William Barton, 1882/83-1886/87
 Jonathon Bassett-Graham, 2009/10
 Michael Bates, 2003/04-2015/16
 William Beard, 1886/87
 John Behrent, 1963/64-1967/68
 Bill Bell, 1952/53
 George Bellars, 1873/74
 Sel Belsham, 1953/54-1958/59
 Richard Bennett, 1975/76
 Percy Beveridge, 1918/19
 Bhupinder Singh, 2009/10-2013/14
 Ian Billcliff, 1997/98-1998/99
 Robert Blair, 1882/83-1883/84
 Jim Blandford, 1939/40-1940/41
 James Blane, 1949/50
 Bruce Bodle, 1958/59
 Ravi Bopara, 2009/10
 Charles Bowden, 1883/84
 Ted Bowley, 1926/27-1928/29
 John Bracewell, 1982/83-1989/90
 Mark Bradley, 1987/88
 Martin Bradley, 1985/86-1987/88
 Richard Brazendale, 1983/84
 J. F. Brook, 1913/14
 Victor Brooker, 1947/48-1949/50
 William Brook-Smith, 1904/05-1922/23
 Chris Brown, 1993/94-1997/98
 Kyle Brown, 1992/93
 Steve Brown, 1987/88-1995/96
 Vaughan Brown, 1987/88-1989/90
 William Brown, 1944/45-1954/55
 Frank Buckland, 1873/74-1882/83
 Gordon Burgess, 1940/41-1954/55
 Mark Burgess, 1966/67-1979/80
 Ces Burke, 1937/38-1953/54
 Herbert Burton, 1922/23-1923/24
 Ronald Bush, 1932/33-1934/35
 William Bush, 1910/11
 Keith Butler, 1953/54-1958/59
 Frederick Byerley, 1931/32

C
 Brad Cachopa, 2010/11-2015/16
 Carl Cachopa, 2004/05-2014/15
 Craig Cachopa, 2012/13-2014/15
 Jonathan Cain, 1994/95
 Matt Cairns, 2001/02
 Edward Cakobau, 1930/31
 James Cammish, 1950/51
 Tama Canning, 1999/2000-2006/07
 William Carlton, 1899/1900
 Randall Carrington, 1953/54-1954/55
 John Carson, 1963/64-1973/74
 Bill Carson, 1936/37-1939/40
 Mark Chapman, 2015/16
 Ellis Child, 1953/54
 Charles Clark, 1913/14
 Leslie Clark, 1959/60-1961/62
 Michael Clark, 1991/92-1996/97
 Trevor Clark, 1931/32
 Don Clarke, 1950/51-1954/55
 Charles Clayforth, 1873/74
 Daniel Clayton, 1894/95-1902/03
 Ossie Cleal, 1939/40-1951/52
 Robert Cleave, 1933/34-1944/45
 Don Cleverley, 1930/31-1950/51
 Robert Coates, 1917/18-1923/24
 Donald Coleman, 1948/49-1957/58
 Guy Coleman, 2001/02
 Henry Colson, 1877/78
 Ivan Cooper, 1924/25-1927/28
 Henry Cooper, 1939/40-1943/44
 Edward Cotterill, 1895/96
 Henry Cotton, 1873/74-1877/78
 Jack Cowie, 1932/33-1949/50
 Sidney Coxon, 1884/85
 Terry Crabb, 1997/98-2001/02
 Steven Croft, 2008/09
 Jeff Crowe, 1982/83-1991/92
 Martin Crowe, 1979/80-1982/83
 William Crump, 1947/48
 Leonard Cuff, 1896/97
 George Cummings, 1907/08-1922/23
 Bob Cunis, 1960/61-1974/75
 John Cushen, 1976/77-1982/83

D
 Ces Dacre, 1914/15-1932/33
 Life Dacre, 1912/13-1913/14
 Heath Davis, 2000/01-2003/04
 Allan Deane, 1947/48
 Ken Deas, 1947/48-1960/61
 Andrew de Boorder, 2007/08-2011/12
 Derek de Boorder, 2005/06
 Colin de Grandhomme, 2006/07-2015/16
 Richard de Groen, 1987/88-1989/90
 Aravinda de Silva, 1996/97
 Albert Dewes, 1881/82-1886/87
 Ernest Dixon, 1873/74
 Keith Dollery, 1949/50
 John Donaldson, 1949/50
 Ian Donnelly, 1981/82
 Michael Dormer, 1961/62
 Richard Drown, 1991/92-1992/93
 Chris Drum, 1996/97-2001/02
 Edmund Dufaur, 1873/74-1882/83
 Percy Dufaur, 1880/81-1882/83
 Eric Dunn, 1954/55-1956/57
 Ted Dunning, 1936/37
 Jack Dunning, 1928/29
 Kevin Dwyer, 1950/51-1953/54
 Ross Dykes, 1967/68-1976/77

E
 David Edmonds, 1933/34-1946/47
 Thomas Elliott, 1894/95-1905/06
 Leonard Elliott, 1924/25-1929/30
 Norman Ellis, 1941/42-1943/44
 Samuel Ellis, 1911/12
 Ray Emery, 1936/37-1946/47
 Wayne Enoka, 1997/98
 Pieter Erasmus, 2006/07-2009/10
 James Everest, 1954/55-1955/56
 George Ewing, 1884/85

F
 Ray Farman, 1957/58-1959/60
 William Fenton, 1971/72
 Lockie Ferguson, 2012/13-2015/16
 Aaron Finch, 2012/13
 Charles Finlayson, 1929/30-1930/31
 Ian Fisher, 1982/83-1992/93
 James Forrest, 1996/97-1997/98
 John Fowke, 1889/90-1893/94
 Bill Fowler, 1981/82-1989/90
 Scott Francis, 1994/95
 Trevor Franklin, 1980/81-1992/93
 Robert Frater, 1918/19-1931/32
 Tipene Friday, 2013/14
 James Fuller, 2013/14-2015/16

G
 William Gardiner, 1889/90-1893/94
 Cecil Gardner, 1881/82-1886/87
 Raoul Garrard, 1917/18-1941/42
 Wilson Garrard, 1918/19-1924/25
 Graham Gedye, 1956/57-1964/65
 James Gerrard, 1924/25-1926/27
 Grant Gibson, 1972/73
 Eric Giles, 1960/61
 John Gill, 1882/83-1884/85
 Hector Gillespie, 1920/21-1931/32
 Stu Gillespie, 1984/85-1988/89
 Charles Gleeson, 1876/77-1877/78
 William Goode, 1909/10
 Robert Gordon, 1912/13
 Ian Gould, 1979/80
 Bernard Graham, 1953/54
 William Graham, 1917/18-1918/19
 Mark Greatbatch, 1982/83-1985/86
 Lindsay Green, 1959/60-1961/62
 Norman Grenier, 1912/13
 Trevor Grierson, 1877/78
 Donovan Grobbelaar, 2012/13-2015/16
 Martin Guptill, 2005/06-2015/16
 Michael Guptill-Bunce, 2012/13-2015/16

H
 Alf Hadden, 1904/05-1910/11
 Dusan Hakaraia, 2010/11-2012/13
 Thomas Hambrook, 1951/52-1958/59
 George Hampton, 1932/33
 Joe Hardstaff, Jr., 1948/49-1949/50
 Noel Harford, 1963/64-1966/67
 Roy Harford, 1965/66-1967/68
 John Harkness, 1892/93
 Roger Harris, 1954/55-1973/74
 Hubert Harrison, 1939/40-1943/44
 Walter Harvie, 1914/15
 Mark Haslam, 1991/92-2002/03
 William Hawkins, 1886/87-1896/97
 Stuart Hay, 1931/32
 Douglas Hay, 1893/94-1906/07
 Carlton Hay, 1893/94
 Simon Hayden, 1996/97
 Johnny Hayes, 1946/47-1958/59
 Gareth Hayne, 2006/07-2007/08
 G. Hayward, 1910/11
 William Hayward, 1935/36
 Tom Hellaby, 1979/80-1987/88
 Ronald Hemi, 1950/51
 Francis Hemmingson, 1945/46-1958/59
 Lancelot Hemus, 1904/05-1921/22
 Rhys Henderson, 1991/92
 Graeme Hick, 1997/98
 Shawn Hicks, 2015/16
 Donald Hill, 1967/68
 Ronnie Hira, 2006/07-2012/13
 Paul Hitchcock, 1997/98-2008/09
 Brad Hodge, 2012/13
 Rowland Holle, 1893/94
 John Hollywood, 1947/48-1949/50
 Glen Hook, 1935/36-1936/37
 Rex Hooton, 1979/80
 Gareth Hopkins, 2007/08-2013/14
 Matt Horne, 1992/93-2005/06
 Phil Horne, 1979/80-1990/91
 Nick Horsley, 2001/02
 Ernest Horspool, 1909/10-1928/29
 Ken Hough, 1957/58-1959/60
 Alan Hounsell, 1973/74
 Patrick Hounsell, 1987/88-1988/89
 Dave Houpapa, 2006/07-2007/08
 Geoff Howarth, 1972/73-1973/74
 Hedley Howarth, 1963/64-1978/79
 Alister Howden, 1906/07-1914/15
 Llorne Howell, 1999/2000-2003/04
 John Howlett, 1891/92
 Alan Hunt, 1981/82-1992/93
 Herbert Hunt, 1929/30-1930/31
 Raymond Hunter, 1975/76-1984/85
 James Hussey, 1904/05-1907/08

I
 Peter Iles, 1946/47-1951/52
 Alexander Irving, 1917/18-1923/24
 Richard Irving, 1995/96-2000/01

J
 Charlie Jackman, 1937/38-1942/43
 Bert Jacobs, 1893/94
 Terry Jarvis, 1964/65-1976/77
 Vishi Jeet, 2014/15
 A. O. Jones, 1911/12
 Gregory Jones, 1976/77
 Richard Jones, 1992/93-2009/10
 Sammy Jones, 1904/05-1908/09

K
 Jocelyn Kallender, 1893/94-1904/05
 John Kasper, 1966/67-1978/79
 Vivian Kavanagh, 1912/13
 Felix Kelly, 1889/90-1897/98
 Paul Kelly, 1981/82-1989/90
 John Kemp, 1960/61-1969/70
 Leonard Kent, 1943/44-1951/52
 Alec Kerr, 1906/07-1912/13
 Allen Kerr, 1941/42-1945/46
 Charles King, 1893/94
 George King, 1873/74
 Richard King, 1996/97-2002/03
 John Kissling, 1886/87-1889/90
 Anaru Kitchen, 2008/09-2014/15
 David Knowles, 1983/84
 Sebastian Kohlhase, 1968/69-1969/70

L
 Andrew Labatt, 1896/97-1897/98
 Jim Laker, 1951/52
 James Langridge, 1927/28
 George Lankham, 1862/63-1880/81
 William Lankham, 1880/81-1883/84
 Henry Lawson, 1891/92-1897/98
 Chris Lee, 1993/94-1996/97
 Max Lewis, 1942/43-1949/50
 Warren Linn, 1980/81
 Johnathan Lintott, 1997/98-1998/99
 Allen Lissette, 1954/55-1955/56
 Tom Lowry, 1917/18
 Mal Loye, 2006/07
 John Lundon, 1892/93-1893/94
 Harold Lusk, 1899/1900-1920/21
 Hugh Lusk, 1889/90
 Newell Lusk, 1899/1900-1904/05
 Dan Lynch, 1876/77-1889/90
 Robert Lynch, 2001/02-2002/03
 Stephen Lynch, 1995/96-1999/2000
 Brendan Lyon, 1997/98
 Trevor Lyon, 1931/32
 Tim Lythe, 1998/99-2006/07

M
 Nathan McAndrew, 2015/16
 Mitchell McClenaghan 2011/12-2015/16
 Charles MacCormick, 1880/81-1893/94
 Evan MacCormick, 1900/01-1913/14
 Bill McCoy, 1929/30-1934/35
 John McDonald, 1956/57-1957/58
 Peter McGregor, 1958/59-1964/65
 Tim McIntosh, 1998/99-2013/14
 John McIntyre, 1961/62-1982/83
 Andy McKay, 2002/03-2008/09
 Robb MacKinlay, 1986/87
 Eddie McLeod, 1920/21-1923/24
 Len McMahon, 1908/09
 Noel McMahon, 1936/37-1937/38
 William McMath, 1917/18-1918/19
 Norman McMillan, 1931/32
 Frank McNeill, 1904/05-1905/06
 Robert McPherson, 1886/87-1889/90
 Cameron Maingay, 1970/71-1971/72
 John Marsdon, 1948/49-1959/60
 Patrick Marshall, 1896/97-1900/01
 Robert Marshall, 1936/37
 Bruce Martin, 2010/11-2013/14
 Chris Martin, 2005/06-2012/13
 Frederick Mason, 1902/03-1914/15
 Mal Matheson, 1926/27-1939/40
 Richard Matthews, 1969/70-1975/76
 David Mayall, 1913/14
 Alexander Meldrum, 1886/87-1889/90
 David Meldrum, 1892/93
 William Meldrum, 1884/85-1886/87
 Cedric Metge, 1923/24-1924/25
 Ted Meuli, 1945/46
 Frederick Middleton, 1917/18
 Frederick Midlane, 1917/18-1918/19
 David Millener, 1964/65-1967/68
 David Miller, 1892/93
 Edward Mills, 1884/85-1886/87
 George Mills, 1886/87-1899/1900
 Isaac Mills, 1889/90-1903/04
 Jason Mills, 1991/92-1998/99
 John Mills, 1924/25-1937/38
 Kyle Mills, 1998/99-2014/15
 William Mills, 1899/1900-1903/04
 Leslie Monteith, 1924/25
 Archer Moresby, 1886/87-1893/94
 Greg Morgan, 2007/08-2009/10
 Richard Morgan, 1998/99-2002/03
 Ross Morgan, 1957/58-1976/77
 John Morris, 1951/52-1956/57
 Peter Morris, 1961/62-1962/63
 Alexander Morrison, 1965/66-1966/67
 Danny Morrison, 1985/86-1996/97
 Herbert Moyle, 1950/51-1956/57
 Jonathan Mumford, 1873/74-1881/82
 Colin Munro, 2006/07-2015/16
 Phil Mustard, 2012/13

N
 Chris Nash, 2013/14
 Dion Nash, 1998/99-2001/02
 Don Neely, 1968/69-1970/71
 James Neesham, 2009/10-2010/11
 Robert Neill, 1889/90-1905/06
 Thomas Neill, 1892/93-1897/98
 Tarun Nethula, 2008/09-2015/16
 Peter Neutze, 1987/88-1988/89
 J. A. Nicholson, 1893/94
 Rob Nicol, 2001/02-2015/16
 Bradley Nielsen, 2001/02-2002/03
 William Norman, 1954/55-1962/63
 Harold Nottman, 1941/42

O
 Adolphus O'Brien, 1881/82-1889/90
 Robert O'Donnell, 2013/14-2015/16
 Alex O'Dowd, 1991/92-1993/94
 Frederick Ohlson, 1894/95-1902/03
 Caleb Olliff, 1903/04-1912/13
 Matthew O'Rourke, 1991/92
 Charles Osmond, 1884/85
 Brendon Oxenham, 1993/94

P
 Joseph Pabst, 1894/95-1897/98
 James Pamment, 1993/94-1995/96
 Kenneth Parker, 1970/71
 Neal Parlane, 2011/12
 Adam Parore, 1988/89-2001/02
 Austin Parsons, 1973/74-1982/83
 Leonard Partridge, 1946/47-1950/51
 Mayu Pasupati, 2005/06-2006/07
 Dipak Patel, 1985/86-1996/97
 James Paterson, 1922/23
 Frederick Pearson, 1910/11
 Herb Pearson, 1932/33-1947/48
 David Perry, 1949/50-1958/59
 Simon Peterson, 1989/90-1996/97
 Eric Petrie, 1950/51-1954/55
 Glenn Phillips, 2014/15-2015/16
 Allen Player, 1919/20-1928/29
 Bill Playle, 1956/57-1963/64
 Blair Pocock, 1990/91-2000/01
 Mark Posa, 1994/95-1995/96
 Alfred Postles, 1924/25-1942/43
 Bryce Postles, 1952/53-1956/57
 Dean Potter, 1997/98-1998/99
 Albert Pratt, 1912/13
 Eddy Prentice, 1945/46
 Leopold Prime, 1907/08
 Chris Pringle, 1989/90-1997/98
 Martin Pringle, 1984/85-1992/93
 Craig Pryor, 1997/98-2003/04
 Richard Pudney, 2000/01-2001/02
 Albert Putt, 1947/48-1950/51

Q
 William Quentery, 1893/94
 Rob Quiney, 2010/11-2011/12
 Matt Quinn, 2012/13-2015/16

R
 Geoff Rabone, 1951/52-1959/60
 Clive Radley, 1984/85
 Jeet Raval, 2008/09-2015/16
 Rodney Redmond, 1969/70-1975/76
 Arthur Rees, 1889/90
 William Lee Rees, 1876/77-1877/78
 John Fulton Reid, 1975/76-1987/88
 Richard Reid, 1985/86-1989/90
 Andrew Reinholds, 1993/94-1995/96
 Albert Relf, 1907/08-1909/10
 Ces Renwick, 1950/51-1959/60
 Charles Restieaux, 1900/01
 Lindsay Rewcastle, 1979/80
 Alan Richards, 1954/55-1955/56
 Isaac Richards, 1886/87-1893/94
 Mark Richardson, 1989/90-2004/05
 Jim Riley, 1972/73-1976/77
 Aubrey Ritchie, 1951/52-1959/60
 Dawson Ritchie, 1943/44
 Allen Roberts, 1947/48
 Sean Roberts, 1994/95
 William Robinson, 1873/74-1886/87
 William Robinson, 1902/03-1912/13
 Richard Rowntree, 1914/15-1931/32

S
 Ned Sale, 1904/05-1914/15
 Scott Sale, 1934/35-1939/40
 R. Sands, 1905/06
 Lloyd Saunders, 1925/26
 George Schmoll, 1903/04-1905/06
 Hector Schuster, 1963/64-1964/65
 Alfred Scott, 1925/26-1927/28
 Derek Scott, 1984/85-1988/89
 Nigel Scott, 1980/81-1987/88
 Verdun Scott, 1937/38-1952/53
 Richard Scragg, 1996/97
 Larry Sewell, 1974/75-1976/77
 Gareth Shaw, 2001/02-2010/11
 Lance Shaw, 2005/06-2009/10
 Richard Sherlock, 2009/10
 Sanjeewa Silva, 1998/99-2001/02
 Herbert Simpson, 1917/18
 John Simpson, 1925/26-1937/38
 Shane Singe, 2003/04
 William Skeet, 1938/39
 Alfred Sloman, 1903/04-1905/06
 Rupert Sloman, 1913/14-1918/19
 Howard Smalley, 1965/66
 Warwick Smeeton, 1913/14-1929/30
 Ian Smith, 1987/88-1991/92
 Nicholas Smith, 1971/72
 Sydney Smith, 1917/18-1925/26
 Colin Snedden, 1938/39-1947/48
 Cyril Snedden, 1920/21
 Martin Snedden, 1977/78-1989/90
 Nessie Snedden, 1909/10-1927/28
 Warwick Snedden, 1946/47
 Jonathan Sole, 2013/14
 Robert Somervell, 1911/12-1921/22
 Brian Sorenson, 1953/54-1958/59
 Bob Sorenson, 1942/43-1943/44
 Lindsay Sparks, 1977/78
 John Sparling, 1956/57-1970/71
 Craig Spearman, 1993/94-1995/96
 Stewart Speed, 1962/63-1970/71
 Leicester Spring, 1936/37
 Charles Stafford, 1880/81-1884/85
 Keith Steele, 1974/75
 William Stemson, 1889/90-1908/09
 Michael Stephens, 1990/91-1997/98
 William Stephens, 1899/1900-1904/05
 Leslie Stephen-Smith, 1931/32
 Charles Stone, 1894/95-1896/97
 Warren Stott, 1969/70-1983/84
 Scott Styris, 2005/06-2009/10
 Murphy Su'a, 1990/91-1995/96
 Kelly Sunderland, 1990/91
 Bert Sutcliffe, 1941/42-1948/49
 Robert Sutton, 1958/59-1973/74
 Thomas Sweet, 1873/74

T
 Harry Tapping, 1950/51-1952/53
 Henry Tattersall, 1912/13-1913/14
 Archibald Taylor, 1975/76-1978/79
 Don Taylor, 1946/47-1960/61
 Frank Taylor, 1909/10-1913/14
 Ken Taylor, 1963/64
 Leslie Taylor, 1910/11-1917/18
 James Testro, 1881/82-1886/87
 George Thompson, 1911/12
 Greg Todd, 2010/11
 Keeley Todd, 2004/05-2009/10
 Tane Topia, 1998/99-2001/02
 Basil Totman, 1897/98
 Richard Tovey, 1960/61-1963/64
 Leslie Townsend, 1934/35-1935/36
 Sean Tracy, 1982/83-1984/85
 Gary Troup, 1974/75-1986/87
 Daryl Tuffey, 2007/08-2011/12
 John Turnbull, 1955/56-1962/63
 Nicholas Turner, 2009/10

U
 Nat Uluiviti, 1954/55-1955/56

V
 Justin Vaughan, 1989/90-1996/97
 Lou Vincent, 1997/98-2012/13
 Graham Vivian, 1966/67-1978/79
 Giff Vivian, 1930/31-1938/39
 Luke Vivian, 2008/09

W
 John Waddingham, 1953/54-1959/60
 Brooke Walker, 1997/98-2004/05
 Alan Wallace, 1910/11-1911/12
 Colin Wallace, 1978/79
 George Wallace, 1941/42-1945/46
 Gregory Wallace, 1976/77-1977/78
 Merv Wallace, 1933/34-1956/57
 Kerry Walmsley, 1994/95-2005/06
 Henry Walters, 1939/40-1941/42
 Harold Walton, 1897/98
 Brian Warner, 1944/45
 Walter Warren, 1897/98
 John Warrington, 1975/76
 Willie Watson, 1984/85-1994/95
 Peter Webb, 1975/76-1986/87
 Frank Weir, 1927/28
 Lindsay Weir, 1927/28-1946/47
 Albert Wensley, 1929/30-1930/31
 David Weston, 1950/51
 William Wheeler, 1944/45
 Reginald Whelan, 1922/23
 Percy White, 1906/07-1907/08
 Paul Whitelaw, 1928/29-1946/47
 Sam Whiteman, 2001/02-2003/04
 Allan Wiles, 1946/47
 Arthur Williams, 1927/28
 John Williams, 1970/71-1975/76
 Norman Williams, 1893/94-1896/97
 Harold Wilson, 1923/24-1926/27
 Thomas Wilson, 1891/92
 John Wiltshire, 1974/75-1980/81
 Paul Wiseman, 1991/92-1993/94
 E. R. Woods, 1913/14
 Rupert Worker, 1914/15
 John Worrall, 1950/51-1954/55
 Ernest Wright, 1894/95-1897/98
 H. Wright, 1912/13-1913/14
 John Wright, 1989/90-1992/93
 Luke Wright, 2013/14-2014/15
 Ivan Wyatt, 1947/48
 William Wynyard, 1882/83-1899/1900

Y
 Robert Yates, 1873/74-1893/94
 Bryan Young, 1998/99
 Reece Young, 1998/99-2012/13

References

Auckland cricketers